Khezrabad District is in Ashkezar County, Yazd province, Iran. At the 2006 National Census, its population was 5,872 in 1,772 households. The following census in 2011 counted 8,483 people in 2,394 households. At the latest census in 2016, the district had 4,547 inhabitants in 1,040 households.

References 

Ashkezar County

Districts of Yazd Province

Populated places in Yazd Province

Populated places in Ashkezar County